This is an index of all passenger rail services operated in Belgium.

Passenger rail services in Belgium are operated by NMBS/SNCB.

The Belgian rail network was reorganised from 14 December 2014. Since this date there are two domestic passenger train categories on the main lines, these are:
Intercity trains - An express, limited-stop service, often calling only at major railway stations; in some cases it has stops at all stations along part of the route.
Local (L) trains (Lokale treinen / trains Locaux) - A local service calling at all stations along the route.

To cater for the large number of commuter workers, especially into Brussels, complementary peak-hours trains run on mornings and late afternoons of working days, they are classified as P-trains.

Another category was added in December 2015, to comprise operations on the Brussels suburban network GEN/RER and took over a good deal of the local trains. These are classified as S-trains, and were later also introduced around other key cities like Antwerp, Liège, Gent.

International (high speed) services operate to countries such as the Netherlands, France, Germany, Luxembourg and Switzerland. These are operated by Thalys, Eurostar, NS International, Deutsche Bahn and SNCF.

Below the train services are arranged by type, and for each type ordered by number. All services are correct to May 2020.

Services

References

 
 
Services